In mathematics, an Azumaya algebra is a generalization of central simple algebras to R-algebras where R need not be a field. Such a notion was introduced in a 1951 paper of Goro Azumaya, for the case where R is a commutative local ring. The notion was developed further in ring theory, and in algebraic geometry, where Alexander Grothendieck made it the basis for his geometric theory of the Brauer group in Bourbaki seminars from 1964–65. There are now several points of access to the basic definitions.

Over a ring

Examples over a field 
Over a field , Azumaya algebras are completely classified by the Artin-Wedderburn theorem since they are the same as central simple algebras. For example, quaternion algebras provide examples of central simple algebras.

Examples over local rings 

Cyclic algebras 
There is a class of Azumaya algebras called cyclic algebras which generate all similarity classes of Azumaya algebras over a field , hence all elements in the Brauer group  (defined below). Given a finite cyclic Galois field extension  of degree , for every  and any generator  there is a twisted polynomial ring , also denoted , generated by an element  such that

and the following commutation property holds:

Note that give a geometrically integral variety , there is also an associated cyclic algebra for the quotient field extension .

Brauer group of a ring 
Over fields, there is a cohomological classification of Azumaya algebras using Étale cohomology. In fact, this group, called the Brauer group, can be also defined as the similarity classes of Azumaya algebras over a ring , where rings  are similar if there is an isomorphism

of rings for some natural numbers .

is a well defined operation. This forms a group structure on the set of such equivalence classes called the Brauer group, denoted . Another definition is given by the torsion subgroup of the etale cohomology group

which is called the cohomological Brauer group. These two definitions agree when  is a field.

Brauer group using Galois cohomology 
There is another equivalent definition of the Brauer group using Galois cohomology. For a field extension  there is a cohomological Brauer group defined as

where the colimit is taken over all finite Galois field extensions.

Computation for a local field 
Over a local non-archimedean field , such as the p-adic numbers , local class field theory gives the isomorphism of abelian groups:pg 193

This is because given abelian field extensions  there is a short exact sequence of Galois groups

and from Local class field theory, there is the following commutative diagram:

where the vertical maps are isomorphisms and the horizontal maps are injections.

n-torsion for a field 
Recall there is the Kummer sequence

giving a long exact sequence in cohomology for a field . Since Hilbert's Theorem 90 implies , there is an associated short exact sequence

showing the second etale cohomology group with coefficients in the n-th roots of unity  is

Generators of n-torsion classes in the Brauer Group over a field 
The Galois symbol, or norm-residue symbol, is a map from the n-torsion Milnor K-theory group  to the etale cohomology group , denoted by

It comes from the composition of the cup product in etale cohomology with the Hilbert's Theorem 90 isomorphism

 

hence

For the Kummer extension  where , take a generator  of the cyclic group, and construct . There is an alternative, yet equivalent construction through Galois cohomology and etale cohomology. Consider the short exact sequence of trivial -modules

The long exact sequence yields a map

For the unique character

and

note the class  is from the Hilberts theorem 90 map . Then, since there exists a primitive root of unity , there is also a class

It turns out this is precisely the class .

Skolem-Noether theorem 
Meaning, the following map is surjective:

where  is the group of units in  This is important because it directly relates to the cohomological classification of similarity classes of Azumaya algebras over a scheme.

gives a cohomological classification of such bundles. Then, this can be related to  using the exact sequence

On a scheme
An Azumaya algebra on a scheme X with structure sheaf , according to the original Grothendieck seminar, is a sheaf  of -algebras that is étale locally isomorphic to a matrix algebra sheaf; one should, however, add the condition that each matrix algebra sheaf is of positive rank. This definition makes an Azumaya algebra on  into a 'twisted-form' of the sheaf .  Milne, Étale Cohomology, starts instead from the definition that it is a sheaf  of -algebras whose stalk  at each point  is an Azumaya algebra over the local ring  in the sense given above.

The Brauer group  of X (an analogue of the Brauer group of a field) is the set of equivalence classes of Azumaya algebras. The group operation is given by tensor product, and the inverse is given by the opposite algebra.

Example over Spec(Z[1/n]) 

then, as a sheaf of -algebras,  has the structure of an Azumaya algebra. The reason for restricting to the open affine set  is because the quaternion algebra is a division algebra over the points  is and only if the Hilbert symbol

which is true at all but finitely many primes.

Example over Pn 

Applications
There have been significant applications of Azumaya algebras in diophantine geometry, following work of Yuri Manin.  The Manin obstruction to the Hasse principle is defined using the Brauer group of schemes.

See also 

 Gerbe
 Class field theory
 Algebraic K-theory
 Motivic cohomology
 Norm residue isomorphism theorem

References

Brauer group and Azumaya algebras 
Milne, John. Etale cohomology. Ch IV

Mathoverflow Thread on "Explicit examples of Azumaya algebras"

Division algebras 

Ring theory
Scheme theory
Algebras